This is a list of television programs currently broadcast (in first-run or reruns), scheduled to be broadcast or formerly broadcast on Telemundo, a Spanish-language American broadcast television network, owned by NBCUniversal, a division of Comcast.

Current programming

Drama 

 Decisiones (2005)
 La Reina del Sur (2011)
 El Señor de los Cielos (2013)
 Más sabe el diablo (August 2, 2021)
Acquired
 Amor y traición (November 28, 2022)

Reality/non-scripted 
 Caso Cerrado (2001)
 Vídeos asombrosos (2008) 
 Shockwave (July 15, 2018)
 Exatlón (July 16, 2018)
 La casa de los famosos (August 24, 2021)
 Así se baila (September 12, 2021)
 Por amor o por dinero (November 17, 2021)
 Top Chef VIP (August 9, 2022)

Awards shows 
 Billboard Latin Music Awards (1999)
 Premios Tu Música Urbano (2022)

Game shows 
 Minuto para ganar (March 23, 2020)
 ¿Qué dicen los famosos? (October 2, 2022)

News 
 Noticias Telemundo (1999)
 Noticias Telemundo Mediodia (2018)
 Noticias Telemundo con Julio Vaquero (2020)
 Al Rojo Vivo (2002)
 Hoy Día (2021)

Talk shows 
 Acceso Total (2010)
 En casa con Telemundo (April 2, 2020)
 La mesa caliente (March 7, 2022)
 Acércate a Rocío (January 2, 2023)

Sports 

 Boxeo Telemundo (1987)
 Fútbol Estelar (1987)
 Titulares Telemundo (1999)
 Juegos Olímpicos por Telemundo (2004)
 NBC Sunday Night Football (2011)
 Fútbol de Premier League (2013)
 Copa Mundial Femnina de la FIFA (2015)
 Copa Mundial Sub-17 de la FIFA (2015)
 Copa Mundial Sub-20 de la FIFA (2015)
 Hockey Telemundo (2015)
 Copa FIFA de la Confederaciones (2017)
 Copa Mundial de la FIFA (2018)

Saturday morning 
 El viajero con Josh García (2018)
 Salvando animales (2018)
 Aventuras con Dylan Dreyer (2018)
 Vivir al natural, Danny Seo (2018)
 Una mano amiga (2018)
 El campeón en ti (2018)

Specials 
 Viva México: El Grito! (2000)
 Macy's Thanksgiving Day Parade (2003–2006, 2016–2017, 2020)
 Virgen de Guadalupe (2000)
 Bienvenido (Upcoming year)! (2016–2018)
 Miss Universo (2003-2014, 2019-present)

Former programming

Original programming

Reality/non-scripted 
 Caso Cerrado: Edición Estelar (2010–2019)
 MasterChef Latino (2018–2019)
 La Voz (2019–2020)

Talk shows 
 A Oscuras Pero Encendidos (1995–2001)
 Don Francisco te invita (2016–2018)
 El Colador (2021)
 Él y ella (1995–2001)
 La Corte del Pueblo (2000–2005)
 La Corte de Familia (2000–2005)
 No Te Duermas (1990–2008)
 Sevcec (1994–1999)
 Suelta La Sopa (2013–2021)

Comedy 
 Los Beltrán (1999–2001)

Awards shows 
 Your World Awards (2012–2017)
 Latin American Music Award (2015–2022)

News 
 Ocurrió Así (1990–2002)
 Enfoque (2010-2018)

Game show 
 Vas o No Vas (2006–2007)
 The Wall (2020)

Acquired programming

Drama series 

 5 viudas sueltas (2013)
 América (2009–2010)
 Amor cautivo (2012–2013) 
 Amor en silencio (1988)
 Amor Mío (2006–2007)
 Amor valiente (2022)
 Anónima (2019)
 Avenida Brasil (2014; 2015)
 Azul Tequila (1999)
 Café con aroma de mujer (2021)
 Catalina y Sebastián (1999–2000)
 Celebridad (2005–2006)
Cennet (2020; 2022)
 El beso del vampiro (2003)
 El Cartel (2008–2010)
 El clavel y la rosa (2003–2004)
 El Clone (2002)
 El color del pecado (2004–2005)
 Él es mi hijo (2022)
 El fuego del destino (2022)
 El Secretario (2012–2013)
 Hasta que la plata nos separe (2022)
 Hasta que te conocí (2016; 2017–2018)
 Hercai, amor y venganza (2021–2022)
 Identidad oculta (2019)
 Infiel, historia de un engaño (2022)
 La Caponera (2002)
 La Esclava Isaura (2007)
 La fuerza del deseo (2001–2002)
 La ley del corazón (2020)
 La prepago (2014)
 La presencia de Anita (2003–2004)
 La sultana (2018–2019; 2020–2021)
 Lazos de familia (2003)
 Llovizna (1997–1998)
 María Bonita (1995)
 Mi gorda bella (2010–2011)
 Mujeres ambiciosas (2017; 2018)
 Mujeres apasionadas (2004)
 Pablo Escobar, el Patrón del Mal (2012, 2014)
 Pasiones secretas (1995–1996)
 Pobre Diabla (1990–1991)
 Rafael Orozco, el ídolo (2013)
 Reglas del juego (2017–2018)
 Señora del destino (2005)
 Siete mujeres (2005)
 Sin tetas no hay paraíso (2010)
 Sobreviviendo a Escobar, Alias JJ (2020)
 Terra Esperanza (2002–2003)
 Terra Nostra (2000–2001)
 Todo por mi hija (2020–2021)
 Uga-Uga (2001–2002)
 Un poquito tuyo (2019)
 Una casa para Azul (2021)
 Vecinos (2011)
 Xica da Silva (2000)
 Yo soy Betty, la fea (2000–2001; 2020–2021)

Reality shows 
 American Ninja Warrior (2020)

Children's programming 

 ¡Aaahh! Monstruos de Verdad (September 19, 1998–September 9, 2000)
 Hey Arnold! (September 19, 1998–September 9, 2000; September 18, 2004–January 2005)
 Las Pistas de Blue (September 19, 1998–September 9, 2000)
 La Vida Mordena de Rocko (September 19, 1998–September 9, 2000)
 Rugrats (September 19, 1998–September 9, 2000; September 18, 2004–September 2, 2006)
 Jumanji (September 19, 1998–September 9, 2000)
 Dora La Exploradora (September 18, 2004-September 2, 2006)
 Rugrats Crecidos (September 18, 2004–September 2, 2006)
 3-2-1 Penguins! (September 9, 2006-September 13, 2009; January 2, 2010-October 2, 2010)
 Babar (September 10, 2006–September 30, 2007; July 5, 2008-June 30, 2012)
 Jacob Two-Two 
 During its run on the Telemundo Kids block: (January 2005-September 2, 2006) 
 During its run on the Qubo block: (September 10, 2006-September 30, 2007; September 19, 2009-October 11, 2009)
 Jane and the Dragon (September 10, 2006–March 28, 2009; September 19, 2009-October 3, 2010; January 7, 2012-June 30, 2012)
 Larryboy Adventures (September 9, 2006–September 29, 2007)
 Little Robots (September 3, 2011–July 1, 2012)
 The Magic School Bus (October 9, 2010–December 31, 2011)
 My Friend Rabbit (October 6, 2007-December 27, 2009)
 Pearlie (October 10, 2010–July 1, 2012)
 Shelldon (October 17, 2009–July 1, 2012)
 Turbo Dogs (October 4, 2008–September 12, 2009; January 2, 2010-December 31, 2011)
 VeggieTales (September 9, 2006–September 13, 2009)
 Willa's Wild Life (September 20, 2009–July 1, 2012)
 The Zula Patrol (July 5, 2008–October 10, 2009; January 7, 2012-June 30, 2012)
 Dragon (September 9, 2006-June 29, 2008)
 Mascotas Maravilla
 Jay Jay the Jet Plane (July 7, 2012–December 8, 2013; April 5, 2014-June 29, 2014)
 LazyTown (July 7, 2012–September 24, 2016)
 Raggs (July 7, 2012–September 24, 2016)
 Noodle and Doodle (July 8, 2012– December 30, 2017)
 The Chica Show (July 6, 2014–2017)
 Nina's World (2016–2017)
 Go Diego Go
 Maya the Bee (2017)
 Dragon Tales (September 13, 2003-September 11, 2004)
 Nubeluz (September 15, 1990–September 14, 1996)
 Jackie Chan Adventures (September 13, 2003-September 11, 2004)
 Las Tres Mellizas (September 13, 2003-September 11, 2004)
 Dragon Ball Z (September 19, 1998–September 9, 2000; September 13, 2003-September 11, 2004)
 Monster by Mistake (September 18, 2004-September 10, 2005)

Programming blocks
 Telemundo Infantil (1995-1998)
 Nickelodeon en Telemundo (1998-2001)
 Telemundo Kids (2001-2006)
 Qubo (2006-2012)
 Mi Telemundo (2012-present) 

Notes

References 

 
Telemundo